Dysderoides is a genus of spiders in the family Oonopidae. It was first described in 1946 by Fage. , it contains 6 species, found in Thailand and India.

Species
Dysderoides comprises the following species:
Dysderoides kaew Grismado & Deeleman, 2014
Dysderoides kanoi Grismado & Deeleman, 2014
Dysderoides lawa Grismado & Deeleman, 2014
Dysderoides muang Grismado & Deeleman, 2014
Dysderoides synrang Grismado & Deeleman, 2014
Dysderoides typhlos Fage, 1946

References

Oonopidae
Araneomorphae genera
Spiders of Asia